Sarah Kayagi Netalisile is a Ugandan politician and member of the parliament.  She was elected in office as a woman Member to represent Namisindwa district located in the Eastern part of Uganda during the 2021 Uganda general elections.

She is a member of the ruling National Resistance Movement party.

References

See also 
 List of members of the eleventh Parliament of Uganda
 Namisindwa District
 National Resistance Movement
 Parliament of Uganda
 Member of Parliament

Members of the Parliament of Uganda
21st-century Ugandan women politicians
21st-century Ugandan politicians
Women members of the Parliament of Uganda
Living people
Year of birth missing (living people)